Conroe is a city in and the county seat of Montgomery County, Texas, United States, about  north of Houston. It is a principal city in the  metropolitan area.

As of 2021, the population was 98,081, up from 56,207 in 2010. Since 2007, the city has increased in size (and population) by annexation, with the city territory expanding from 52.8 to 74.4 square miles. Some communities have attempted to fight such annexation. According to the Census Bureau, Conroe was the fastest-growing large city in the United States between July 1, 2015, and July 1, 2016.

History
The city is named after Isaac Conroe. Born in the North, he served as a Union Cavalry officer and settled in Houston after the Civil War. There he became a lumberman. Conroe founded a sawmill in this area in 1881. The community built its early economy and wealth on the lumber industry. Originally named "Conroe's Switch", the community received an influx of workers and residents in the late 19th century who were attracted to the growth of the lumber industry, which harvested the local piney wood forest.

In 1886, Conroe Mill School was established in the expanding town. Conroe Normal and Industrial College, a school for African Americans, served the area.

Six lynchings were recorded in Montgomery County around the turn of the century, and some suspects were lynched at the courthouse in Conroe. In 1922, a young black man named Joe Winters was lynched, burned alive on the courthouse square for allegedly attacking a young white woman. Within the black community, it was known he was in a consensual relationship with the woman, who denied it when they were discovered.

In 1941 Bob White was shot to death in the courthouse, during his third trial. The African-American man was arrested in 1936 on charges of assaulting a white woman in Livingston, Texas. (Alternative accounts in the black community said they had a standing consensual relationship.) He was first tried there, before an all-white jury. They convicted him. The case was appealed with the help of the NAACP in Houston because he had not been given a lawyer or been able to contact family, and he was tortured in interrogation. The second trial was held in Conroe for a change of venue. Another all-white jury convicted White again. The case reached the United States Supreme Court on appeal, which had just ruled that coerced confessions were unconstitutional and remanded the case to the lower court for trial. During the proceedings in the courtroom, in front of the judge and numerous witnesses, the husband of the alleged victim shot White in the back of the head and immediately killed him. The husband was arrested and tried the following week, and was acquitted.

In 1931 George W. Strake discovered the Conroe Oil Field. By 1935, the field had produced 40 million barrels of oil.

During the 1930s, because of oil profits, the city briefly boasted more millionaires per capita than any other U.S. city. After the construction of Interstate 45 in the postwar period improved automobile access,  many Houstonians began to follow the highway to new suburban communities that developed around Conroe.

Geography
The Office of Management and Budget classifies Conroe as a principal city within the  metropolitan area.

Annexation
When Conroe incorporated in 1904, the city limits encompassed a 5.44 square mile area. From 1970 to 2000, the city limits expanded from 7.15 square miles to 42.35 square miles. Beginning in 2007, the city outlined a plan to continue expanding its city limits through annexation. According to Chapter 43 of the Texas Local Government Code, home rule municipalities like Conroe may annex territory that is adjacent to the city's current boundaries, with certain restrictions. The city's 2007 plan projected doubling its size through a combination of voluntary and involuntary annexations. As of 2022, the city has annexed territory every year since 2007, increasing the city limits from 52.8 to 77.5 square miles.

In April 2015, residents of the gated community of April Sound filed a lawsuit against Conroe after their community was annexed on January 1, 2015. The lawsuit was dismissed in March 2017. Involuntary annexations were a major issue in the 2016 mayoral election, the first after April Sound residents were incorporated into the city. Proponents of annexation contended that it was a useful tool to "promote and facilitate growth and progress," while those in opposition were concerned about whether annexed territories receive a "fair shake" in the negotiations. In 2017, the city council voted in favor of additional involuntary annexations.

Ecosystem

Conroe is in the southwest corner of the East Texas Piney Woods. The Piney Woods consist of pine trees and hardwood forests. The most common type of tree in the southwest Piney Woods is the loblolly pine. Shortleaf pine are also abundant. Pockets of blackland prairie vegetation are also present, but are disappearing due to urbanization.

In 1926, the Texas A&M Forest Service purchased 1700 acres of Piney Woods to establish W. Goodrich Jones State Forest. The forest serves as a research and demonstration area for sustainable forestry techniques. The forest also preserves the habitat of the red-cockaded woodpecker, a species classified in the early 21st century as Near Threatened by the IUCN.

In 2017, Texas A&M asked Conroe state senator Brandon Creighton to author a bill setting aside 10 percent of the forest for educational and research-related development. The bill also opened the possibility of commercial development on the land. Public concern over the bill persuaded Creighton to revise it. The final version, which passed the Senate unanimously, protected the entire forest from development.

Water resources

The West Fork of the San Jacinto River flows through the western edge of Conroe. The entire city is within the river's watershed. The river flows southeast from Lake Conroe, a 19,640 surface acre lake created by a dam in 1973 to establish an alternative source of drinking water for Houston.

Conroe developed over several geologic layers of underground aquifers, which supply the city with fresh drinking water. Due to rapid development in this area, and the increased population of Conroe and the surrounding area, the groundwater supply is being withdrawn faster than it can be replenished. As a result, the Lone Star Groundwater Conservation District, which oversees groundwater usage in Montgomery County, mandated that Conroe reduce its groundwater usage by 30 percent of 2009 amounts by January 1, 2016. As part of the groundwater usage reduction plan, the San Jacinto River Authority began in September 2015 to supplement Conroe's groundwater supply with surface water pumped from Lake Conroe. The SJRA charges the city usage fees to cover the cost of pumping and treating the water.

On August 27, 2015, the City of Conroe filed a lawsuit against the Lone Star Groundwater Conservation District, claiming that the LSGCD did not have the authority to limit the city's groundwater usage. The city also refused to pay SJRA water usage fee increases in 2016, resulting in a separate lawsuit filed by the SJRA against the city. The LSGCD and Conroe reached a settlement agreement in January 2019. The SJRA case was dismissed in June 2020.

Parts of Conroe surrounding the West Fork of the San Jacinto River are in a floodplain. Significant flooding occurs along the floodplain when rainfall exceeds nine inches in a 48-hour period. The Conroe area has approximately a 10 percent chance of receiving this much rainfall in any given year. Urban development in Conroe and the surrounding area has also exacerbated the risk of flooding. Montgomery County had 500-year floods in three successive years, in May 2015, April 2016, and August 2017. A 500-year flood has a 0.2 percent chance of occurring in a year. In addition, a fourth major flood occurred in May 2016, resulting in two major floods in two months.

The flooding in August 2017 took place during Hurricane Harvey, when nearly 32 inches of rain fell on the city. To protect the integrity of the dam, San Jacinto River Authority officials released 79,100 cubic feet per second of water from Lake Conroe downstream into the West Fork of the San Jacinto River, exacerbating flooding already taking place in the floodplain. Conroe city officials ordered a mandatory evacuation of McDade Estates, a neighborhood on the banks of the river. As a response to the flooding, Montgomery County commissioners in October 2017 requested $1.25 million from the federal government for a flood mitigation study, along with an additional $95.5 million to implement various flood mitigation projects.

Demographics

During the first decade of the 21st century, the city attracted many new residents from the Houston area. Renée C. Lee said that Conroe around 2002 was "a sleepy, backwater town" and that at the time, Conroe city officials needed to use financial incentives to attract home developers to Conroe. Between 2003 and 2006, Conroe became a hotbed of construction of new houses. As a result, Conroe's population grew from 36,811 in 2000 to 56,207 in 2010.

As of the 2020 United States census, there were 89,956 people, 32,547 households, and 21,369 families residing in the city.

As of the census of 2010, there were 56,207 people, 18,651 households, and 13,086 families residing in the city. Since the 2010 census, Conroe's population has continued to grow. Between 2014 and 2015, Conroe was the sixth fastest growing city in the United States. The following year, the US Census Bureau reported that Conroe was the fastest-growing large city in the United States. It had a 7.8% growth rate between 2015 and 2016. New housing developments throughout the city have contributed to the rapid population growth. Conroe's annexation of growing communities within its extraterritorial jurisdiction has also contributed to its growth.

The demographics of the city's downtown area south of SH 105 differs from the rest of the city. In 2010, the population density of the entire city was 1066.2 people per square mile (411.7/km). By contrast, the population density downtown was between 3,475.2 and 4,119.3 people per square mile.

The racial makeup of the city was 69.7% White (including Hispanic), 10.3% African American, 1.2% Native American, 1.8% Asian, less than 0.05% Pacific Islander, 13.7% from other races, and 3.2% from two or more races. Hispanic or Latino of any race were 38.5% of the population. White alone (not Hispanic or Latino) were 48.3% of the total population. In the southern portion of downtown, White alone made up between 20.4 and 22.4 percent, African American were between 19.0 and 20.3 percent, and Hispanic or Latino were between 56.6 and 57.7 percent of the population.

According to the 2016 American Community Survey, the median income for a household in the city was $50,517 and the median income for a family was $60,087. Males had a median income of $44,343 versus $37,747 for females. The per capita income for the city was $28,672. About 12.2% of families and 16.1% of the population were below the poverty line, including 19.4% of those under age 18 and 7.6% of those age 65 or over. In response to income inequality, several non-profit groups including the Montgomery County United Way, The Salvation Army, and the Crisis Assistance Center help provide residents of the area with a variety of services ranging from transportation to food and shelter.

Economy 
In the early 1980s, Exxon considered consolidating its employees to a site in Conroe. The company ended the plans after the local oil-based economy collapsed.

According to the City's 2016 Comprehensive Annual Financial Report, the top employers in the city are:

Culture 

Downtown Conroe's Central Business District hosts multiple arts venues. The oldest is the Crighton Theatre, which opened on November 26, 1935. The theatre is named after Harry M. Crighton, Conroe's mayor from 1932 to 1933. The theatre functioned as the community's movie theatre until 1967, at which point it fell into disrepair. In 1979 it was renovated, and it now hosts live theatrical productions. Another theatre, the Owen Theatre, is also located in the district. The Central Business District has outdoor performance venues at Conroe Founder's Plaza and Heritage Place, which host multiple festivals throughout the year.

The city supports several arts organizations, including the Greater Conroe Arts Alliance. The Alliance is a network of multiple arts groups in the city such as the Conroe Symphony, the Conroe Art League, and the Montgomery County Choral Society. The Alliance also sponsors, along with the state of Texas, the Young Texas Artists Music Competition. The competition, founded in 1983, showcases young musicians who aspire to careers in classical music. In 2009, the city sponsored the Art Bench Project, which converted 13 stone benches scattered throughout the central business district into works of art. Each bench portrays a different part of Conroe's history and culture, from historical figures like George Strake and Charles B. Stewart to contemporary art groups such as the Crighton Players.

Parks and recreation 

The city contains multiple parks which document local history. The Heritage Museum of Montgomery County maintains artifacts of Montgomery County's early settlers.

The Lone Star Monument and Historical Flag Park displays the flags that flew over Texas. The flags are positioned in a circle around the park, with a statue of a Texian in the center. Each flag comes with a plaque that describes its connection to Texas history.<ref>Meyer, Brad. Lone Star Flag Park celebrates Texas History. Houston Chronicle': April 15, 2012. Retrieved March 15, 2018.</ref> At the park's entrance is a statue of Charles B. Stewart, who is claimed to have designed the lone star flag.

Montgomery County War Memorial Park is a memorial to the 166 soldiers from Montgomery County who have been killed in active duty. The park's dedication ceremony was in 1976 and featured a speech by President Gerald Ford.Ford, Gerald R. Remarks at Dedication Ceremonies for the Montgomery County War Memorial Park in Conroe, Texas. The American Presidency Project: April 29, 1976. Retrieved March 15, 2018. In 2017, the Montgomery County Commissioners Court and the City of Conroe agreed to relocate and expand the memorial, to include the names of up to 50,000 soldiers who have lived in Montgomery County.Dominguez, Catherine. Commissioners commit to help fund Montgomery County war memorial. San Antonio Express News: March 30, 2017. Retrieved March 15, 2018. As of June 2019, the expansion is ongoing.

Lake Conroe, northwest of downtown Conroe, is a site for such water-based activities as boating and fishing. The most common fish in the lake are Largemouth bass, bluegill, channel catfish, white bass, and hybrid striped bass. Crappie may also be found in the early spring and fall.

Government

Local government

For the 2019 Fiscal Year, the city had $157.8 million in revenues and $147.9 million in expenditures. The city's net position was $189.7 million.

The structure of the management and coordination of city services is:

Law enforcement
The Conroe Police Department has 142 full-time police officers and 42 support staff. The department has a number of bureaus. The Uniformed Services Bureau includes the Patrol Division, SWAT a part time unit and honor guard. The Support Services Bureau the Criminal Investigations Division and animal control unit.

On 14 September 1982, Sergeant Ed Holcomb was shot and killed while responding to a domestic disturbance call.

In July 2013, Conroe Police Sergeant Jason Blackwelder was off duty, and he observed store employees chasing a shoplifting suspect. He joined the chase. In an isolated area, Blackwelder killed the suspect with a single gunshot to the back of the head. In June 2014, he was convicted of manslaughter. He was sentenced to five years' probation.

 Public libraries 
The county operates the main branch of the Montgomery County Memorial Library System.

State government
98% of Conroe is represented in the Texas Senate (District 4) by Republican Brandon Creighton. A small portion of the northern part of Conroe is part of District 3, represented by Republican Robert Nichols.

In the Texas House of Representatives, 94% of Conroe is part of District 16, represented by Republican Will Metcalf. The southern portion of Conroe is in District 15, represented by Republican Mark Keough. Less than 1% of Conroe residents are part of District 3, represented by Republican Cecil Bell, Jr.

The Texas Department of Criminal Justice (TDCJ) operates the Conroe District Parole Office in Conroe.

Federal government
At the Federal level, the two U.S. senators from Texas are Republicans John Cornyn and Ted Cruz. Conroe is part of Texas's 8th congressional district, which is represented by Republican Kevin Brady.

The United States Postal Service Conroe Post Office is located at 809 West Dallas Street.

 Education 

 Colleges and universities 
Residents of both Conroe ISD and Willis ISD (and therefore the whole city of Conroe) are served by the Lone Star College System (formerly North Harris Montgomery Community College).

It is primarily served by the Lone Star College-Montgomery Campus and LSC University Center. Other campuses in the county include the EMCID Center in New Caney, and the Conroe Center. The territory in Conroe ISD joined the community college district in 1991, and the territory in Willis ISD joined the district in 1996.

The Catholic University of St. Thomas opened a campus in Conroe in fall 2020. The Old Conroe Police building has been adapted to serve as a temporary site for up to three years. The permanent campus is proposed to be at Deison Technology Park. Class of 1952 alumnus Vincent D'Amico offered the university  of land in east Montgomery County for the project.

Public school districts
Almost all areas of Conroe are within the Conroe Independent School District though a small northern section of Conroe is within the Willis Independent School District.

 Conroe Independent School District 
All of the schools listed here are in the city of Conroe. Approximately 60% of the Conroe ISD section of Conroe is zoned to Conroe High School though some parts of Conroe attend Oak Ridge High School and Caney Creek High School.

The junior high schools that serve the Conroe High School feeder zone are:
John V. Peet Junior High School
Washington Junior High School
Albert B. Moorhead Junior High School

Some intermediate schools that serve the Conroe High School feeder zone are:
Cryar Intermediate School
Travis Intermediate School
Bozman Intermediate School

Some elementary schools that serve the Conroe High School feeder zone are:
Anderson Elementary School
Neil Armstrong Elementary School
Giesinger Elementary School
Sam Houston Elementary School
O. A. Reaves Elementary School
B. B. Rice Elementary School
J. W. Runyan Elementary School
Wilkinson Elementary School

 Willis Independent School District 
The Willis ISD section is zoned to Turner Elementary School, Brabham Middle School, and Willis High School.

 Private schools 

Sacred Heart Catholic School – Roman Catholic Archdiocese of Galveston-Houston
 Covenant Christian School
Lifestyle Christian School
Montgomery Christian Academy

The closest Catholic high school is Frassati Catholic High School in north Harris County; Conroe is in the school's intended catchment area.

MediaThe Courier is a daily newspaper published in Conroe, Texas, covering Montgomery County. In 2016, the newspaper was purchased by Hearst Communications, a media conglomerate which also owns and operates the Houston Chronicle.

Two Houston television stations,  Ion owned-and-operated KPXB-TV (channel 49) and Quest owned-and-operated KTBU (channel 55), are licensed to Conroe.  Both stations operate from studios located in the city of Houston.

Infrastructure
Transportation

In 2012 the U.S. Census Bureau classified the area around Conroe and The Woodlands as a "large urbanized transit area." This is defined as an area having more than 200,000 residents, which makes it eligible to receive federal transportation funds, particularly to support transit.

Interstate 45 directly connects the city with Houston to its south (40 miles) and with Dallas to its northwest (200 miles).
Texas Highway 105 connects the city of Cleveland to the east and town of Montgomery to the west.
Texas Loop 336 circles the city of Conroe.
Conroe-North Houston Regional Airport provides general aviation services to Conroe.
Greyhound Bus Lines operate a small station.
Metropolitan Transit Authority of Harris County, Texas (291 Conroe Park & Ride) provide service to Downtown Houston.
The City of Conroe launched a local bus service, Conroe Connection, in 2015. It runs Monday through Friday, from 7:00 am to 7:00 pm
Burlington Northern Santa Fe Railway BNSF Railway operates the busy Conroe subdivision, an east-west railroad main line that runs from Silsbee in Hardin County to Navasota in Grimes County. There it intersects a main line running between Fort Worth and Galveston.
Union Pacific Railroad Corporation operates another busy main line that runs north from Houston in Harris County to Palestine in Anderson County, known as the Palestine subdivision. The two railroads intersect at a diamond in downtown Conroe between Main and First Streets.

Healthcare
In the early 1920s the Mary Swain Sanitarium, was established as the first organized healthcare institution in the city. The Mary Swain Sanitarium was private.

In 1938 the Montgomery County Hospital, a public institution, replaced it. It had 25 beds. The hospital closed after a new hospital of the Montgomery County Hospital District opened in 1982.

Notable people
 Brandon Allen, former Major League Baseball player for Arizona Diamondbacks
 Brian Barkley, former pitcher for Boston Red Sox
Kyle Bennett, professional BMX racer
Richard Bradford, motion picture and television actor, notable leading roles in Man in the Suitcase, The Untouchables and Trip to Bountiful''
Clarence Lee Brandley, exonerated prisoner
Jeromy Burnitz, Conroe High School 1987, baseball player drafted by New York Mets in 1990, played for Milwaukee Brewers
Rock Cartwright, NFL running back, San Francisco 49ers
Andrew Cashner, Conroe High School 2005, drafted by Chicago Cubs, pitcher for Texas Rangers
Jonathan Daviss, leading role in the Netflix series Outer Banks (TV series)
Colin Edwards, two-time World Superbike champion and former MotoGP rider
Annette Gordon-Reed, historian and law professor at Harvard University, MacArthur fellow and winner of the Pulitzer Prize for History and the National Book Award for Nonfiction
John Hambrick, broadcast journalist, reporter, actor, voice-over announcer, and TV documentary producer
Matt Lepsis, former National Football League player for the Denver Broncos and Super Bowl XXXIII winner
Parker McCollum, Texas Country musician
John Monroe (baseball), infielder in Major League Baseball for the New York Giants and Philadelphia Phillies 
Kevin Slowey, starting pitcher for MLB's Minnesota Twins
 Grant Stuard, NFL player for the Tampa Bay Buccaneers and 2021 Mr. Irrelevant

Climate
The climate in this area is characterized by hot, humid summers and generally mild to cool winters.  According to the Köppen Climate Classification system, Conroe has a humid subtropical climate, abbreviated "Cfa" on climate maps.

See also

Explanatory notes

References

External links

Conroe/Lake Conroe Chamber of Commerce
Conroe in Handbook of Texas
 

 
Cities in Montgomery County, Texas
Cities in Texas
County seats in Texas
Greater Houston
Populated places established in the 1880s